West Coast Bad Boyz: High Fo Xmas is a compilation album by No Limit Records. It was released on November 8, 1994 and featured hip-hop Christmas songs.

Track listing 

Christmas compilation albums
Hip hop compilation albums
1994 compilation albums
1994 Christmas albums
No Limit Records compilation albums
Gangsta rap compilation albums